The Apache Junction Unified School District is a school district in Apache Junction, Arizona, additionally serving the town of Gold Canyon. It was formed in 1952 and serves 3404 students at three elementary schools, one middle school, one alternative school, and one high school.

References

External links
District website

School districts in Maricopa County, Arizona
School districts in Pinal County, Arizona
1952 establishments in Arizona
School districts established in 1952